Eleutherodactylus albolabris is a species of frog in the family Eleutherodactylidae.
It is endemic to Mexico.
Its natural habitat is subtropical or tropical moist lowland forest.

It is found in the Sierra Madre del Sur of Guerrero state, from 285 to 1,300 meters elevation, with an  extent of occurrence (EOO) of 11,121 km2. It has been collected at Agua del Obispo and south of Mazatlán, in the vicinity of Acahuizotla, and from the Sierra de Tecpan in western Guerrero east to San Luis Acatlán in eastern Guerrero.

It is threatened by habitat loss.

References

albolabris
Endemic amphibians of Mexico
Fauna of the Sierra Madre del Sur
Amphibians described in 1943
Taxa named by Edward Harrison Taylor
Taxonomy articles created by Polbot